Kiniviliame Naholo (born 16 April 1999 in Fiji) is a New Zealand rugby union player, who currently plays as a wing for  in New Zealand's domestic National Provincial Championship competition and for the  in Super Rugby. He was previously part of the  squad for the 2020 Super Rugby season and the  squad for 2022.

Reference list

External links
itsrugby.co.uk profile

1999 births
Living people
Fijian emigrants to New Zealand
New Zealand people of I-Taukei Fijian descent
People educated at Hastings Boys' High School
New Zealand rugby union players
Rugby union wings
Taranaki rugby union players
Chiefs (rugby union) players
Crusaders (rugby union) players
Hurricanes (rugby union) players